Musabekov may refer to:

 Firdavsbek Musabekov, Uzbekistani Paralympic swimmer
 Gazanfar Musabekov, Soviet politician
 Zəhmətkənd, Azerbaijan